Aspidimorpha deusta is a species of beetles belonging to the Chrysomelidae family.

Description

Distribution
Aspidimorpha deusta occurs in Indonesia, Malaysia and Australia.

References
 Southeast Asian Beetles
 Zipcodezoo Species Identifier

Cassidinae
Beetles of Australia
Beetles described in 1775
Taxa named by Johan Christian Fabricius